Spodnja Rečica is a settlement on the banks of the Savinja River in the Municipality of Rečica ob Savinji in Slovenia. The area belongs to the traditional Styria region and is now included in the Savinja Statistical Region.

References

External links
Spodnja Rečica on Geopedia

Populated places in the Municipality of Rečica ob Savinji